Sir Francis Bryan (about 1490 – 2 February 1550) was an English courtier and diplomat during the reign of Henry VIII. He was Chief Gentleman of the Privy chamber and Lord Justice of Ireland. Unlike many of his contemporaries, Bryan always retained Henry's favour, achieving this by altering his opinions to conform to the king's. His rakish sexual life and his lack of principle at the time of his cousin Anne Boleyn's downfall led to his earning the nickname the Vicar of Hell.

Career
Francis Bryan was the son of Sir Thomas Bryan and Margaret Bourchier, and came to court at a young age. There he became, along with his brother-in-law Nicholas Carew, one of "the King's minions", a group of young gentlemen of the Privy chamber who held much sway with Henry and were known for their intemperate behaviour. He was rewarded for his friendship with the king by a number of public offices, Master of the Toils (1518–48), Constable of the castles of Hertford (1518–34), Harlech (1521-death) and Wallingford (1536). He was also Joint Constable of Warwick Castle from 1528, Cipherer of the Household (1520), Gentleman of the Privy Chamber (by 1521), and Esquire of the Body by 1522. He was knighted in 1522 for his courage during the capture of Morlaix in Brittany.
 

In 1519, Bryan and Sir Edward Neville disgraced themselves in the eyes of the minions' detractors when, during a diplomatic mission to Paris, they threw eggs and stones at the common people. Under the influence of Cardinal Wolsey, Sir Francis was removed from the Privy chamber in 1519, and again in 1526 as part of the Eltham Ordinances.

Shortly after this he lost an eye in a tournament at Greenwich, and had to wear an eyepatch from then on. In 1528, when Sir William Carey's death left a vacancy in the Privy chamber, Bryan returned to fill his place, possibly through the good offices of his cousin Anne Boleyn. From then on he was highly influential, becoming one of the king's most favoured companions, and a leading member of the faction who wished to break Wolsey's grip on power. He was employed on a number of important overseas diplomatic missions. He also sat in the Parliament of England as Member for Buckinghamshire probably in 1529 and certainly in the parliaments of 1539, 1542 and 1545.

Bryan was a half cousin of both Anne Boleyn and Catherine Howard as well as half second cousin to Jane Seymour. He promoted the family of the latter, which was less well connected than the Boleyns and tried to find her a husband after her family had grown notorious because of the affair between Catherine Fillol and Jane's father.

He remained a friend of the King, with Henry even ending his pursuit of a lady when he heard that Bryan was seriously interested in her. 'The Vicar of Hell', as Francis was known, was also a close ally of Nicholas Carew, the husband of Francis' sister, Elizabeth Carew. However, by 1536, Bryan was working with Thomas Cromwell to bring about his cousin's downfall as queen. This moved Cromwell himself to coin Bryan's nickname, in a letter to the Bishop of Winchester, referring to his abandonment of Anne. After Boleyn's death, Bryan became chief Gentleman of the Privy chamber, but was removed from this post in 1539 when Cromwell turned against his former allies. Sir Francis returned to favour following Cromwell's demise, becoming vice-admiral of the fleet, and then Lord Justice of Ireland during the reign of Edward VI.

Character
Bryan was a distinguished diplomat, soldier, sailor, cipher, man of letters, and poet. However, he had a lifelong reputation as a rake and a libertine, and was a rumoured accomplice in the king's extramarital affairs. He was a trimmer, changing his views to suit Henry's current policy, but was also one of the few men who dared speak his mind to the king.

No portrait of Sir Francis survives.

Marriage
Before 1522, he married Philippa Spice, who was the daughter of Humphrey Spice of Black Notley, Essex, and the widow of John Fortescue of Ponsbourne.

In August 1548, he married Lady Joan Fitzgerald, the widow of James Butler, 9th Earl of Ormond, and the mother of seven sons. It is believed the marriage was a political manoeuvre to prevent Joan marrying her cousin, the 15th Earl of Desmond, and the union was not a happy one. After Bryan's death, Lady Joan married in 1551 her third husband, Gerald FitzGerald, 15th Earl of Desmond, who was many years her junior.

Portrayals in fiction
Bryan is a character in Hilary Mantel's novel Wolf Hall.

Bryan is played by actor Alan van Sprang in Season 3 of the television series, The Tudors. In the series, he arrives at Court in 1536 and wears an eye patch, much later than the actual Sir Francis, and so his family ties to the Boleyns are not mentioned, nor are his successes afterwards.

In the 2003 two-part drama Henry VIII starring Ray Winstone, a character named 'Sir Francis' who sports an eye patch and is a former soldier friend of Henry's, makes several appearances.

Notes

References

 

1490s births
1550 deaths
16th-century English diplomats
16th-century Royal Navy personnel
People from Aylesbury Vale
Gentlemen of the Privy Chamber
15th-century English people
Political office-holders in pre-partition Ireland
Esquires of the Body
English knights